Isaac ben David Pardo was a rabbi as well as the author of "To'afot Re'em", a commentary on the responsa of Rabbi Ahai of Shabha, with an index of the different responsa. He succeeded his father, Rabbi David Pardo, as rabbi of Sarajevo, Bosnia. His brother was Jacob Pardo.

"To'afot Re'em" was published posthumously at Thessaloniki in 1811.

References 

Bosnia and Herzegovina people of Italian descent
Bosnia and Herzegovina rabbis
Bosnia and Herzegovina Sephardi Jews
Place of birth unknown
Place of death missing
Year of birth unknown
Year of death missing
People of Italian-Jewish descent